Chengdu–Lanzhou railway is a Chinese railway line under construction, connecting Chengdu, the provincial capital of  Sichuan with Lanzhou, capital of Gansu, with a branch connecting Chengdu to Xining, the capital of Qinghai. The line was planned and approved in the aftermath of the 2008 Sichuan earthquake, in order to improve future transportation in the affected area, through which the line will pass directly.

Profile
It is being built as a double-track electrified railway, at the national railway line class I level. The total investment is expected to be 61.939 billion yuan.

Run time for train services will be reduced to about 5 hours.

Route
Chengdu–Lanzhou railway will head north from the Chengdu hub to Qingbaijiang through Shifang, Mianzhu, Anxian and tunnelling through Longmen Shan to Maoxian, tracing along the Minjiang River valley and on through Chuanzhusi to Jiuzhaigou County. Crossing into the territory of Gansu, across the Bailong River, it joins the Lanzhou-Chongqing HSR at Hadapu, using that railway line to the terminus at Lanzhou West station.

In the early design plan, the Chenglan railway will pass through Minshan Mountain after Chuanzhusi station , enter Gansu, cross the Bailong River, and connect with the Lanzhou-Chongqing railway at Hadapu station, and share the same line with the Lanzhou-Chongqing railway to the end of Lanzhou East station. In subsequent adjustments, the route north of Huangshengguan station was changed to an integrated design with Chengdu-Xining railway and no longer connected to the Lanzhou-Chongqing railway. The new line will extend from Huangshengguan station to the northwest and enter Gannan via Zoige. It will connect with the Lanzhou-Hezuo railway in Hezuo City. It will then enter Lanzhou via Gannan and Linxia.

A branch will extend from Hezuo to Xining, providing a more direct route between Xining and Chengdu.

Stations
Chengdu, Qingbaijiang East, Qingbaijiang, Dawan, Sanxingdui, Shifang, Mianzhu, Anxian, Shiziyuan, Maoxian, Diexi, Zhenjiangguan, Songpan, Chuanzhusi, Huangshengguan, Remoke, Jiuzhaigou, Baigusi, Shangzhangwan, Hadapu, Minxian, Weiyuan and Lanzhou East

Construction

Construction on the railway started on 26 February 2011 in Songpan County, Sichuan. The Chengdu-Huangshengguan (Songpan County) section is planned to be completed first in 2023, with the entire main corridor to be opened in 2026.

References

Railway lines in China
Rail transport in Gansu
Rail transport in Sichuan